Alexander McDonnell may refer to:
Alexander McDonnell (chess player) (1798–1835), Irish chess master
Alexander McDonnell (engineer) (1829–1904), locomotive engineer of the Great Southern & Western Railway (Ireland), & North Eastern Railway (England)
Alexander MacDonnell, 3rd Earl of Antrim (1615–1699), Roman Catholic peer and military commander in Ireland
Alexander McDonnell, 9th Earl of Antrim (1935–2021)

See also
Alexander McDonell (disambiguation)
Alexander MacDonnell (disambiguation)